Dorothea Lynde Dix (April 4, 1802July 17, 1887) was an American advocate on behalf of the indigent mentally ill who, through a vigorous and sustained program of lobbying state legislatures and the United States Congress, created the first generation of American mental asylums. During the Civil War, she served as a Superintendent of Army Nurses.

Early life
Born in the town of Hampden, Maine, she grew up in Worcester, Massachusetts among her parents' relatives. She was the first child of three born to Joseph Dix and Mary Bigelow, who had deep ancestral roots in Massachusetts Bay Colony. Her mother suffered from poor health, thus she wasn't able to provide consistent support to her children. Her father was an itinerant bookseller and Methodist preacher. At the age of twelve, she and her two brothers were sent to their wealthy grandmother, Dorothea Lynde (married to Dr. Elijah Dix) in Boston to get away from her alcoholic parents and abusive father. She began to teach in a school all for girls in Worcester, Massachusetts at fourteen years old and had developed her own curriculum for her class, in which she emphasized ethical living and the natural sciences. In about 1821 Dix opened a school in Boston, which was patronized by well-to-do families. Soon afterward she also began teaching poor and neglected children out of the barn of her grandmother's house, but she suffered poor health. It has been suggested that Dorothea suffered from major depressive episodes, which contributed to her poor health. From 1824 to 1830, she wrote mainly devotional books and stories for children. Her Conversations on Common Things (1824) reached its sixtieth edition by 1869, and was reprinted 60 times and written in the style of a conversation between mother and daughter. Her book The Garland of Flora (1829) was, along with Elizabeth Wirt's Flora's Dictionary, one of the first two dictionaries of flowers published in the United States. Other books of Dix's include Private Hours, Alice and Ruth, and Prisons and Prison Discipline. 

Although raised Catholic and later directed to Congregationalism, Dix became a Unitarian.
After Dix's health forced her to relinquish her school, she began working as a governess on Beacon Hill for the family of William Ellery Channing, a leading Unitarian intellectual. It was while working with his family that Dix traveled to St. Croix, where she first witnessed slavery at first hand, though her experience did not dispose her sympathies toward abolitionism. In 1831, she established a model school for girls in Boston, operating it until 1836, when she suffered a breakdown. Dix was encouraged to take a trip to Europe to improve her health. While she was there she met British social reformers who inspired her. These reformers included Elizabeth Fry, Samuel Tuke and William Rathbone with whom she lived during the duration of her trip in Europe. In hopes of a cure, in 1836 she traveled to England, where she met the Rathbone family. During her trip in Europe and her stay with the Rathbone family, Dorothea's grandmother died and left her a "sizable estate, along with her royalties" which allowed her to live comfortably for the remainder of her life. It was also during this trip that she came across an institution in Turkey, which she used as a model institution despite its conditions being just like other facilities. They invited her as a guest to Greenbank, their ancestral mansion in Liverpool. The Rathbones were Quakers and prominent social reformers. At Greenbank, Dix met their circle of men and women who believed that government should play a direct, active role in social welfare. She was also introduced to the reform movement for care of the mentally ill in Great Britain, known as lunacy reform. Its members were making deep investigations of madhouses and asylums, publishing their studies in reports to the House of Commons.

Antebellum career

Reform movements for treatment of the mentally ill were related in this period to other progressive causes: abolitionism, temperance, and voter reforms. After returning to America, in 1840-41 Dix conducted a statewide investigation of care for the mentally ill poor in Massachusetts. Dorothea's interest for helping out the mentally ill of society started while she was teaching classes to female prisoners in East Cambridge. She saw how these individuals were locked up and whose medical needs weren't being satisfied since only private hospitals would have such provisions. It was during her time at the East Cambridge prison, that she visited the basement where she encountered four mentally ill individuals, whose cells were "dark and bare and the air was stagnant and foul". She also saw how such individuals were labeled as "looney paupers" and were being locked up along with violently deranged criminals and received treatment that was inhumane.

In most cases, towns contracted with local individuals to care for mentally ill people who could not care for themselves and lacked family/friends to do so. Unregulated and underfunded, this system resulted in widespread abuse. Dix published the results in a fiery report, a Memorial, to the state legislature. "I proceed, Gentlemen, briefly to call your attention to the present state of Insane Persons confined within this Commonwealth, in cages, stalls, pens! Chained, naked, beaten with rods, and lashed into obedience." Her lobbying resulted in a bill to expand the state's mental hospital in Worcester.

During the year 1844 Dix visited all the counties, jails and almshouses in New Jersey in a similar investigation. She prepared a memorial for the New Jersey Legislature, giving a detailed account of her observations and facts. Dix urgently appealed to the legislature to act and appropriate funds to construct a facility for the care and treatment of the mentally ill. She cited a number of cases to emphasize the importance of the state taking responsibility for this class of unfortunates. Dix's plea was to provide moral treatment for the mentally ill, which consisted of three values: modesty, chastity, and delicacy.

She gave as an example a man formerly respected as a legislator and jurist, who, suffering from mental decline, fell into hard times in old age. Dix discovered him lying on a small bed in a basement room of the county almshouse, bereft of even necessary comforts. She wrote: "This feeble and depressed old man, a pauper, helpless, lonely, and yet conscious of surrounding circumstances, and not now wholly oblivious of the past—this feeble old man, who was he?" Many members of the legislature knew her pauper jurist. Joseph S. Dodd introduced her report to the Senate on January 23, 1845.

Dodd's resolution to authorize an asylum passed the following day. The first committee made their report February 25, appealing to the New Jersey legislature to act at once. Some politicians secretly opposed it due to taxes needed to support it. Dix continued to lobby for a facility, writing letters and editorials to build support. During the session, she met with legislators and held group meetings in the evening at home. The act of authorization was taken up March 14, 1845, and read for the last time. On March 25, 1845, the bill was passed for the establishment of a state facility.

Dix traveled from New Hampshire to Louisiana, documenting the condition of the poor mentally ill, making reports to state legislatures, and working with committees to draft the enabling legislation and appropriations bills needed. In 1846, Dix traveled to Illinois to study mental illness. While there, she fell ill and spent the winter in Springfield recovering. She submitted a report to the January 1847 legislative session, which adopted legislation to establish Illinois' first state mental hospital. 

In 1848, Dix visited North Carolina, where she again called for reform in the care of mentally ill patients. Her first attempt to bring reform to North Carolina was denied. However, after a board member's wife requested, as a dying wish, that Dix's plea be reconsidered, the bill for reform was approved. In 1849, when the (North Carolina) State Medical Society was formed, the legislature authorized construction of an institution in the capital, Raleigh, for the care of mentally ill patients. Dix Hill Asylum, named in honor of Dorothea Dix's father, was eventually opened in 1856. One hundred years later, the Dix Hill Asylum was renamed the Dorothea Dix Hospital, in honor of her legacy. A second state hospital for the mentally ill was authorized in 1875, Broughton State Hospital in Morganton, North Carolina; and ultimately, the Goldsboro Hospital for the Negro Insane was also built in eastern part of the state. Dix had a biased view that mental illness was related to conditions of educated whites, not minorities (Dix, 1847).

She was instrumental in the founding of the first public mental hospital in Pennsylvania, the Harrisburg State Hospital. In 1853, she established its library and reading room.

The high point of her work in Washington was the Bill for the Benefit of the Indigent Insane, legislation to set aside  of Federal land  to be used for the benefit of the mentally ill and the remainder for the "blind, deaf, and dumb". Proceeds from its sale would be distributed to the states to build and maintain asylums. Dix's land bill passed both houses of the United States Congress; but in 1854, President Franklin Pierce vetoed it, arguing that social welfare was the responsibility of the states. Stung by the defeat of her land bill, in 1854 and 1855 Dix traveled to England and Europe. She reconnected with the Rathbone family and, encouraged by British politicians who wished to increase Whitehall's reach into Scotland, conducted investigations of Scotland's madhouses. This work resulted in the formation of the Scottish Lunacy Commission to oversee reforms.

Dix visited the British colony of Nova Scotia in 1853 to study its care of the mentally ill. During her visit, she traveled to Sable Island to investigate reports of mentally ill patients being abandoned there. Such reports were largely unfounded. While on Sable Island, Dix assisted in a shipwreck rescue. Upon her return to Boston, she led a successful campaign to send upgraded life-saving equipment to the island. The day after supplies arrived, a ship was wrecked on the island. Thankfully, because of Dix's work, 180 people were saved.

In 1854, Dix investigated the conditions of mental hospitals in Scotland, and found them to be in similarly poor conditions. In 1857, after years of work and opposition, reform laws were finally passed. Dix took up a similar project in the Channel Islands, finally managing the building of an asylum after thirteen years of agitation. Extending her work throughout Europe, Dix continued on to Rome. Once again finding disrepair and maltreatment, Dix sought an audience with Pope Pius IX. The pope was receptive to Dix's findings and visited the asylums himself, shocked at their conditions. He thanked Dix for her work, saying in a second audience with her that "a woman and a Protestant, had crossed the seas to call his attention to these cruelly ill-treated members of his flock."

The Civil War
During the American Civil War, Dix, on June 10, 1861, was appointed Superintendent of Army Nurses by the Union Army, beating out Dr. Elizabeth Blackwell.

Dix set guidelines for nurse candidates. Volunteers were to be aged 35 to 50 and plain-looking. They were required to wear unhooped black or brown dresses, with no jewelry or cosmetics. Dix wanted to avoid sending vulnerable, attractive young women into the hospitals, where she feared they would be exploited by the men (doctors as well as patients). Dix often fired volunteer nurses she hadn't personally trained or hired (earning the ire of supporting groups like the United States Sanitary Commission).

At odds with Army doctors, Dix feuded with them over control of medical facilities and the hiring and firing of nurses. Many doctors and surgeons did not want any female nurses in their hospitals. To solve the impasse, the War Department introduced Order No. 351 in October 1863. It granted both the Surgeon General (Joseph K. Barnes) and the Superintendent of Army Nurses (Dix) the power to appoint female nurses. However, it gave doctors the power of assigning employees and volunteers to hospitals. This relieved Dix of direct operational responsibility. As superintendent, Dix implemented the Federal army nursing program, in which over 3,000 women would eventually serve. Meanwhile, her influence was being eclipsed by other prominent women such as Dr. Mary Edwards Walker and Clara Barton. She resigned in August 1865 and later considered this "episode" in her career a failure. Although hundreds of Catholic nuns successfully served as nurses, Dix distrusted them; her anti-Catholicism undermined her ability to work with Catholic nurses, lay or religious. 

Her even-handed caring for Union and Confederate wounded alike assured her memory in the South. Her nurses provided what was often the only care available in the field to Confederate wounded. Georgeanna Woolsey, a Dix nurse, said, "The surgeon in charge of our camp...looked after all their wounds, which were often in a most shocking state, particularly among the rebels. Every evening and morning they were dressed." Another Dix nurse, Julia Susan Wheelock, said, "Many of these were Rebels. I could not pass them by neglected. Though enemies, they were nevertheless helpless, suffering human beings."

When Confederate forces retreated from Gettysburg, they left behind 5,000 wounded soldiers. These were treated by many of Dix's nurses. Union nurse Cornelia Hancock wrote about the experience: "There are no words in the English language to express the suffering I witnessed today...."

She was well respected for her work throughout the war because of her dedication. This stemmed from her putting aside her previous work to focus completely on the war at hand. With the conclusion of the war her service was recognized formally. She was awarded with two national flags, these flags being for "the Care, Succor, and Relief of the Sick and wounded Soldiers of the United States on the Battle-Field, in Camps and Hospitals during the recent war." Dix ultimately founded thirty-two hospitals, and influenced the creation of two others in Japan.

Postwar life
At the end of the war, Dix helped raise funds for the national monument to deceased soldiers at Fortress Monroe. Following the war, she resumed her crusade to improve the care of prisoners, the disabled, and the mentally ill. Her first step was to review the asylums and prisons in the South to evaluate the war damage to their facilities. In addition to pursuing prisons reforms after the civil war, she also worked on improving life-saving services in Nova Scotia, establishing a war memorial at Hampton Roads in Virginia and a fountain for thirsty horses at the Boston Custom Square.

In 1881, Dix moved into the New Jersey State Hospital, formerly known as Trenton State Hospital, that she built years prior. The state legislature had designated a suite for her private use as long as she lived. Although in poor health, she carried on correspondence with people from England, Japan, and elsewhere. Dix died on July 17, 1887. She was buried in Mount Auburn Cemetery in Cambridge, Massachusetts.

Honors

Dix was elected "President for Life" of the Army Nurses Association (a social club for Civil War Volunteer Nurses), but she had little to do with the organization. She opposed its efforts to get military pensions for its members.
In December 1866 she was awarded two national flags for her service during the Civil War. This award was awarded for "the Care, Succor, and Relief of the Sick and wounded Soldiers of the United States on the Battle-Field, in Camps and Hospitals during the recent War."
In 1979 she was inducted into the National Women's Hall of Fame.
In 1983 the United States Postal Service honored her life of charity and service by issuing a 1¢ Dorothea Dix Great Americans series postage stamp.
In 1999 a series of six tall marble panels with a bronze bust in each was added to the Massachusetts State House; the busts are of Dix, Florence Luscomb, Mary Kenney O'Sullivan, Josephine St. Pierre Ruffin, Sarah Parker Remond, and Lucy Stone. As well, two quotations from each of those women (including Dix) are etched on their own marble panel, and the wall behind all the panels has wallpaper made of six government documents repeated over and over, with each document being related to a cause of one or more of the women.
A United States Navy transport ship serving in World War II was named for Dix, the USS Dorothea L. Dix.
The Bangor Mental Health Institute was renamed in August 2006 to the Dorothea Dix Psychiatric Center.
A crater on Venus was named Dix in her honor.
She is remembered on the Boston Women's Heritage Trail.

Numerous locations commemorate Dix, including the Dix Ward in McLean Asylum at Somerville, Dixmont Hospital in Pennsylvania, the Dorothea L. Dix House, and the Dorothea Dix Park located in Raleigh, North Carolina.

Works
 Published anonymously.

 

She wrote a variety of other tracts on prisoners. She is also the author of many memorials to legislative bodies on the subject of lunatic asylums and reports on philanthropic subjects.

For young readers
 

Note: other replications of this book are also available via Google Books.
 Alice and Ruth
 Evening Hours
and other books.

See also
Kirkbride Plan
Dorothea Dix Hospital
 Other nurses of the American Civil War
 Louisa May Alcott
 Addie L. Ballou
 Mary Ann Bickerdyke
 Louisa Hawkins Canby
 Helen L. Gilson
 Mary Phinney von Olnhausen
 Virginia Gonzalez Torres - often referred to as Dorothea Dix of Mexico

Notes

References

Further reading
Baker, Rachel. Angel of Mercy: The Story of Dorothea Lynde Dix. New York: Messner, 1955.
Brown, Thomas J. Dorothea Dix: New England Reformer. Cambridge, Mass: Harvard University Press, 1998.
Dix, Dorothea Lynde, and David L. Lightner. Asylum, Prison, and Poorhouse: The Writings and Reform Work of Dorothea Dix in Illinois. Carbondale, Ill: Southern Illinois University Press, 1999.
Lowe, Corinne. The Gentle Warrior: A Story of Dorothea Lynde Dix. New York: Harcourt, Brace, 1948.
Marshall, Helen E. Dorothea Dix: Forgotten Samaritan. Chapel Hill: The University of North Carolina press, 1937.
Norman, Gertrude. Dorothea Lynde Dix. Lives to remember. New York: Putnam, 1959.

Schlaifer, Charles, and Lucy Freeman. Heart's Work: Civil War Heroine and Champion of the Mentally Ill, Dorothea Lynde Dix. New York: Paragon House, 1991.
Wilson, Dorothy Clarke. Stranger and Traveler: The Story of Dorothea Dix, American Reformer. Boston: Little, Brown, 1975.

For young readers
Colman, Penny. Breaking the Chains: The Crusade of Dorothea Lynde Dix. White Hall, Va: Shoe Tree Press, 1992.
Herstek, Amy Paulson. Dorothea Dix: Crusader for the Mentally Ill. Historical American biographies. Berkeley Heights, NJ: Enslow Publishers, 2001.
Malone, Mary, and Katharine Sampson. Dorothea L. Dix: Hospital Founder. A Discovery biography. New York: Chelsea Juniors, 1991.
Muckenhoupt, Margaret. Dorothea Dix: Advocate for Mental Health Care. Oxford portraits. New York: Oxford University Press, 2003.
Schleichert, Elizabeth, and Antonio Castro. The Life of Dorothea Dix. Pioneers in health and medicine. Frederick, Md: Twenty-First Century Books, 1992.
Witteman, Barbara. Dorothea Dix: Social Reformer. Let freedom ring. Mankato, Minn: Bridgestone Books, 2003.

External links

 Dorothea Dix Correspondence from the Historic Psychiatry Collection, Menninger Archives, Kansas Historical Society
 Robin Pape, Burkhart Brückner: Biography of Dorothea Lynde Dix in: Biographical Archive of Psychiatry (BIAPSY), 2015.

1802 births
1887 deaths
American activists
American nursing administrators
People from Boston
People from Worcester, Massachusetts
People of Massachusetts in the American Civil War
People from Hampden, Maine
United States Sanitary Commission people
Mental health activists
Burials at Mount Auburn Cemetery
Psychiatric nurses
American Civil War nurses
American women nurses
Prison reformers
Antitrinitarians